The Botanical and Zoological Garden of Tsimbazaza, short Tsimbazaza Zoo (in French Parc Botanique et Zoologique de Tsimbazaza or PBZT) is a zoological and botanical garden in the neighbourhood of Tsimbazaza in Antananarivo, Madagascar, located just north of the National Assembly of Madagascar building.

It is said to house "the finest collection of Malagasy wildlife", with several unique species on display. The zoo has a museum with collections of tribal carvings and the skeleton of extinct megavertebrates, including an elephant bird, pygmy hippos, and giant lemurs. It also contains Madagascar's largest herbarium (herbarium code TAN) with roughly 80,000 plant specimens.

In November 1989, the WWF celebrated its tenth year in Madagascar by opening an environmental teaching center at the zoo.

See also
Madagascar Biodiversity Center
List of museums in Madagascar
Lemurs' Park

References

Buildings and structures in Antananarivo
Zoos in Madagascar